|}
{| class="collapsible collapsed" cellpadding="0" cellspacing="0" style="clear:right; float:right; text-align:center; font-weight:bold;" width="280px"
! colspan="3" style="border:1px solid black; background-color: #77DD77;" | Also Ran

The 1999 Epsom Derby was a horse race which took place at Epsom Downs on Saturday 5 June 1999. It was the 220th running of the Derby, and it was won by Oath. The winner was ridden by Kieren Fallon and trained by Henry Cecil. The pre-race favourite Dubai Millennium finished ninth.

Race details
 Sponsor: Vodafone
 Winner's prize money: £611,450
 Going: Good (Good to Soft in places)
 Number of runners: 16
 Winner's time: 2m 37.43s

Full result

* The distances between the horses are shown in lengths or shorter. shd = short-head; hd = head; nk = neck.† Trainers are based in Great Britain unless indicated.

Winner's details
Further details of the winner, Oath:

 Foaled: 22 April 1996, in Ireland
 Sire: Fairy King; Dam: Sheer Audacity (Troy)
 Owner: The Thoroughbred Corp.
 Breeder: Mrs Max Morris
 Rating in 1999 International Classifications: 123

Form analysis

Two-year-old races
Notable runs by the future Derby participants as two-year-olds in 1998.

 Daliapour – 3rd Haynes, Hanson and Clark Stakes, 1st Autumn Stakes
 Housemaster – 5th Chesham Stakes, 3rd Racing Post Trophy
 Glamis – 2nd Stardom Stakes, 2nd Royal Lodge Stakes, 3rd Grand Critérium
 Saffron Walden – 2nd Killavullan Stakes
 Compton Admiral – 2nd Chesham Stakes, 2nd Solario Stakes
 Brancaster – 1st Horris Hill Stakes
 Lucido – 3rd Preis des Winterfavoriten

The road to Epsom
Early-season appearances in 1999 and trial races prior to running in the Derby.

 Oath – 1st Dee Stakes
 Daliapour – 1st Blue Riband Trial Stakes, 2nd Lingfield Derby Trial
 Beat All – 1st Newmarket Stakes
 Housemaster – 3rd Feilden Stakes, 4th Chester Vase (disq from 1st)
 Glamis – 3rd Sandown Classic Trial, 7th Dante Stakes
 Saffron Walden – 1st Leopardstown 2,000 Guineas Trial Stakes, 1st Irish 2,000 Guineas
 Compton Admiral – 1st Craven Stakes, 13th 2,000 Guineas
 Dubai Millennium – 1st Predominate Stakes
 Brancaster – 2nd Craven Stakes, 4th 2,000 Guineas
 Val Royal – 1st Prix Matchem, 1st Prix de Guiche
 Zaajer – 1st Glasgow Stakes
 Salford Express – 1st Dante Stakes
 Lucido – 1st Lingfield Derby Trial
 Through the Rye – 4th Dee Stakes

Subsequent Group 1 wins
Group 1 / Grade I victories after running in the Derby.

 Daliapour – Coronation Cup (2000), Hong Kong Vase (2000)
 Housemaster – Hong Kong Champions & Chater Cup (2000)
 Compton Admiral – Eclipse Stakes (1999)
 Dubai Millennium – Prix Jacques Le Marois (1999), Queen Elizabeth II Stakes (1999), Dubai World Cup (2000), Prince of Wales's Stakes (2000)
 Val Royal – Breeders' Cup Mile (2001)

Subsequent breeding careers
Leading progeny of participants in the 1999 Epsom Derby.

Sires of Classic winners
Dubai Millennium (9th)
 Dubawi - 1st Irish 2,000 Guineas (2005)
 Echo Of Light - 1st Prix Daniel Wildenstein (2006)
 Belenus - 1st Sovereign Stakes (2006)
 Oude - 3rd Champagne Stakes (2004)
Val Royal (11th) 
 Cockney Rebel 1st 2000 Guineas Stakes, 1st Irish 2000 Guineas (2007)
 Soy Carambolo - 1st Gran Premio Carlos Pellegrini (2013)
 Slim Shadey - 2nd Turf Classic Stakes (2012)
 Harper Valley - 3rd Anniversary 4-Y-O Novices' Hurdle (2008)

Sires of National Hunt horses
Daliapour (2nd)
 Le Grande Dame - 2nd Prix Renaud du Vivier (2007)
 Aupcharlie - 2nd Fort Leney Novice Chase (2012)
 Zaliapour - Winner of three listed hurdle races in France
 Sun Zephyr - Winner of two listed hurdle races in France
Saffron Walden (7th) - Initially exported to Japan before standing in Ireland
 Moon Racer - 1st Champion Bumper (2015), 1st Sharp Novices' Hurdle (2016)

Other Stallions
Oath (1st) - Exported to Japan, exported to India - Love Caerna (3rd Yushun Himba 2007)Beat All (3rd) - Gentleman Jon (1st Badger Ales Trophy 2016)Compton Admiral (8th) - Beauchamp Xerxes (2nd Cocked Hat Stakes 2009)Salford Express (14th) - Minor jumps winners

References

External links
 Colour Chart – Derby 1999

Epsom Derby
 1999
Epsom Derby
Epsom Derby
1990s in Surrey